Marinci is a village in the Nuštar municipality in the Vukovar-Syrmia County in eastern Croatia located northeast of Vinkovci and southwest of Vukovar. The population is 670 (census 2011).

The village is located on the county road Ž4137 Nuštar-Bogdanovci-Vukovar and its position was strategically important during the 1991 Battle of Vukovar.

Marinci were built on the foundations of an older Roman settlement. A Catholic church of the Immaculate Conception of the Blessed Virgin Mary was built in the center of the village in 1855, demolished in 1992 and rebuilt in 2005.

Name
The name of the village in Croatian is plural.

References

Populated places in Vukovar-Syrmia County
Populated places in Syrmia